VMPS may refer to:
 Vivekanand Memorial Public School, a school in Raisinghnagar, India
 VLAN Management Policy Server, a networking protocol
 Veritone Minimum Phase Speakers, a manufacturer of loudspeakers